Hendon School is a mixed secondary school in Golders Rise, Hendon, with academy status since November 2011 (previously a comprehensive) in the London Borough of Barnet. It specialises in languages, offering lessons  amongst others to its students.

Overview
Hendon School is a mixed comprehensive school with 1,296 pupils on roll, including approximately 240 sixth form students. The school is situated just off the A502 and North Circular Road in London. It serves an area that is generally more affluent than average but has some pockets of deprivation, as interpreted in comparison to national averages according to Ofsted.

The student population is culturally diverse, multi-faith and multi-lingual, with more than half of students speaking languages other than English as their first language. The proportion of students eligible for free school meals is well above the national average. The school specialises in languages, and has specialist educational facilities for deaf students and for autistic students. The school has been over-subscribed for the past four years and was designated an Outstanding school by Ofsted in November 2011.
The school was previously a "failing school", being placed in Special Measures by Ofsted in 2005, but subsequently deemed Satisfactory.

History

Foundation
Hendon School now occupies the site where the 16th-century mapmaker John Norden lived, and only a pond survives from the park of Greenhill.

The County School, Hendon opened as a fee-paying school of 350 pupils in September 1914, just a month after the outbreak of the First World War. By 1927, the field at the back of the school was levelled and trees planted, and in 1929–1930 the building of the gymnasium was started. In 1931, the intake of pupils rose from a two form entry to a three form entry, and by 1932–1933 the extension on the north side of the original school building was finished to enable accommodation of 480 pupils. In 1936 former pupil Harold Whitlock planted an oak tree sapling in front of the entrance to the gymnasium which he had received, along with his gold medal for the  walk, from Adolf Hitler at the Berlin Olympic Games.

Hendon County Grammar School
By 1955 the school had 620 pupils and 32 staff, resulting in a necessary extension on the east side of the main building, which included a new Hall, Dining Hall and Kitchens. This was officially opened in 1961. In the late 1960s, when plans for the reorganisation of secondary education were passed by Parliament, the London Borough of Barnet suggested the amalgamation of Hendon County Grammar School, situated in Golders Rise, with St David's County Secondary School for Boys, in St David's Place, West Hendon. Hendon Grammar School Choir released commercial recordings with Owen Brannigan, with traditional British songs.

Former St David's County Secondary School pre-1971
On 1 October 1929, Barnfield Senior Boys’ School opened in Silkstream Road, Burnt Oak, Edgware with 267 boys. In January 1964 it amalgamated with Brent Secondary Modern School on its site in Sturgess Avenue, West Hendon. Brent Modern School, a mixed school, had opened on 7 January 1936 having been formally inaugurated the previous October by Princess Louise, Duchess of Argyll, the daughter of Queen Victoria. In readiness for the joining of the Barnfield and Brent schools, new buildings were erected in St David's Place, and the two adjacent sites became one school named St David's after its location. Originally it was to be named The Grahame-White School after Claude Grahame-White, the famous English aviator who had established Hendon Aerodrome, but permission by his family was declined.

Hendon Senior High School
In 1971, this merger took place. Hendon County Grammar School became Hendon Senior High School, and St David's County Secondary School for Boys was renamed Hendon Junior High School. In 1978, when all the new buildings on the Hendon County site were finished, the whole school became completely integrated on one site and called by its present name Hendon School.

During 1987–88 the school was threatened with closure by the London Borough of Barnet claiming falsely that it was no longer a viable institution, but by 1988–1989 the school had survived the threat and was awarded Grant-maintained status by the Conservative Government. Hendon became a foundation school with the changes to state funding of education which were brought about by the School Standards and Framework Act 1998. Extensions to the new buildings close to the perimeter on the south side of the site took place during the 1990s to provide extra room for the Maths and Music departments.

Hendon School today
The school currently has an eight form intake with approximately 1,300 pupils, 120 teachers and 30 ancillary staff as well as a Saturday School for Languages with 200 pupils and 11 teachers. With an expanding sixth form roll, the school built a new Sixth Form Centre close to the eastern perimeter of the 6-acre site in 2011, which provides classrooms and facilities exclusively for use by the sixth form students. In late 2011, the school completed the expansion of the autism unit and the expansion of internal and external dining facilities within and around the original school building. In November 2011, the school converted to become an academy school, although chose not to change the name of the school. The Ofsted inspection in November 2011 graded the school to be outstanding. The school was previously a "failing school" in Special Measures by Ofsted in 2005 and subsequently deemed Satisfactory.

Academic results
Hendon School has sustained five years of improving results at GCSE, and in 2011 63% of students achieved 5 A*-C grades, which puts the school in 16th place out of 24 schools in Barnet local authority. At A level, the school is in the bottom 15% of Barnet schools, ranking 23rd out of 26 schools for 3 A Levels achieved.

Notable former pupils

 Morgan Fisher, musician and photographer (1961–68)
 Carl Martin
 Harry Melling
 Michael Obiora
 James Ward
 Antony Costa
 Amber Rose Revah
 Gary Shoefield, television and film producer
 Oliver Stark

Hendon County Grammar School
 Dr Dora Black (née Braham), director, Royal Free Hospital child trauma clinic
 Rabbi Lionel Blue
 Bernard Braine, Baron Braine of Wheatley, former Conservative MP
 Ashleigh Brilliant, writer and cartoonist (1947–52)
 Sir Philip Cohen, Royal Society research professor
 Robert Earl, founder of the Planet Hollywood chain
 Prof Mark Freedland, professor of employment law 
 Prof Harvey Goldstein, professor of social statistics
Christopher Gunning, composer
 Ruth Prawer Jhabvala, novelist
 Professor Peter Maitlis FRS, organometallic chemist
 Peter Mandelson, Baron Mandelson, former Labour MP
 Gerald Ratner
 Michael Sternberg, professor at Imperial College London
 Harold Whitlock, Olympic walker
 Frank Williams, known for playing the Reverend Timothy Farthing in Dad's Army

See also
 List of schools in the London Borough of Barnet
 London Borough of Barnet

References

External links
 EduBase
 Hendon School website

Academies in the London Borough of Barnet
Educational institutions established in 1914
Secondary schools in the London Borough of Barnet
1914 establishments in England
Hendon